This list of University of Tampa alumni includes both graduates and non-graduates of the University of Tampa.

List

References 

University of Tampa